The Girl Scout National Center West was located just outside Ten Sleep, Wyoming, among the Big Horn Mountains, near the entrance to Ten Sleep Canyon.

History
The single largest land acquisition in Girl Scouts of the USA history, the center was purchased in 1968. Girl Scouts and Girl Guides from all over the world engaged in outdoor activities including horseback riding, backpacking, fishing, orienteering, exploring Native American pictographs and study of geology. Sample programs that were offered included Hike-A-Peak, a 19-day backpacking event for girls 16-18 years old; Tote 'N Trek, a 9-day backpacking excursion for novice backpackers ages 14-18; Saddle Straddle, a 6-day pack trip for experienced riders; and Paint the West, focusing on arts skills and exploring western art. The site also supported Wider Opportunities, family camping, and camping for troops traveling to other destinations.

In 1978, Mutual of Omaha's Wild Kingdom filmed part of its show at the National Center West, featuring wildlife projects made by Girl Scouts.

Closure
Because of high maintenance costs, the center was closed in 1989; the land was sold in 1991. A part of the site is now owned and operated by The Nature Conservancy as the  Tensleep Preserve, with facilities for workshops and seminars. The remaining  are part of the Clay Ranch.

See also
 Philmont Scout Ranch

References

Geography of Wyoming
Girl Scouts of the USA
1968 establishments in Wyoming
Protected areas established in 1968